Kidby is a surname. Notable people with the surname include:

 D. J. Kidby (born 1987), Canadian curler
 Dustin Kidby (born 1985), Canadian curler
 Paul Kidby (born 1964), English artist

See also
 Kirby (surname)